On 7 March 1983, Balkan Bulgarian Airlines Flight 013, operated by an An-24, was hijacked by four hijackers demanding to go to Austria.

Aircraft 
The aircraft involved was an Antonov An-24, registration LZ-AND with the manufacturer's serial number 77303301. The aircraft first flew in 1968.

Incident 
A Balkan Bulgarian Airlines An-24 was hijacked shortly after taking off at 18:00 local time for a regular flight from Sofia to Varna. Four men, aged from 17 to 22 (Lachezar Ivanov, Krasen Gechev, Ivaylo Vladimirov and Valentin Ivanov), produced knives and took the 40 passengers and crew hostage. They claimed to the passengers that they were recently escaped recidivist criminals and threatened that they would depressurise the plane if an attempt were made to disarm them or impede the takeover. The hijackers proceeded to threaten the stewardess and demanded the plane be diverted to Vienna. A passenger was sent to the cockpit to communicate their demands to the pilot, who in turn relayed them to local authorities and received orders to simulate compliance, while actually maintaining a course to Varna. Meanwhile, authorities cut off all electrical power to Varna, in order to prevent the hijackers from recognising the Black Sea coast. After landing at the Varna airport, a Bulgarian police officer and an airport worker, who spoke fluent German were disguised as Austrian airport staff as they attempted to convince the hijackers that they were in Vienna  and to lure them out of the plane. The hijackers asked for a translator to negotiate their surrender, until one of them noticed that the disguised police officer was wearing a Bulgarian made leather jacket, which led them to panic and threaten to start executing hostages. At this point the crew managed to let four commandos aboard the plane through a hatch in the luggage compartment. The commandos stormed the plane, disarmed and arrested three of the hijackers. The only remaining hijacker, Valentin Ivanov, had locked himself in the airplane bathroom and threatened to kill the stewardess. Two more commandos entered the plane through the passenger hatch, kicked in the bathroom door and shot Ivanov as he attempted to kill his hostage. Ivanov was the only victim of the incident. The stewardess, having sustained a wound in her neck and bleeding heavily, was quickly transported to a nearby hospital and made a full recovery.

In Popular Culture 
The crash was featured in Season 23, Episode 8 of the Canadian documentary series Mayday, titled "Deadly Deception".

See also 

 TABSO Flight 101
 Balkan Bulgarian Airlines Flight 307
 1978 Balkan Bulgarian Tupolev Tu-134 crash

References 

Aircraft hijackings
Accidents and incidents involving the Antonov An-24
Aviation accidents and incidents in Bulgaria
Aviation accidents and incidents in 1983
March 1983 events in Europe
1983 in Bulgaria
1983 crimes in Bulgaria